Htamin jin (also spelt htamin gyin) is a Burmese dish of fermented rice. It is the regional specialty and signature dish of the Intha people of Inle Lake in Shan State, Myanmar.

The dish consists of either fresh or fermented rice, kneaded with boiled fish (usually caught from the Inle Lake, such as nga gyin), fresh tomato paste, mashed boiled potatoes and garlic garnish. Highland Shan rice, similar to Japanese rice, is used alongside the creamier Shan potatoes, giving the dish a very rich texture.

Garlic chives roots, garlic oil and crispy garlic garnish are added as a final touch. Htamin Jin is usually served with roasted chili flakes in oil.

See also
 Cuisine of Burma
 Shan Inspired Burmese Dishes

References 

Burmese cuisine
Rice dishes
Shan State